Pakistanis in South Africa include Overseas Pakistanis and people of Pakistani descent who reside in South Africa. The majority of them live in Cape Town, Johannesburg, Durban and Grahamstown.

Many expatriates run spaza shops, Cellphone; and the Johannesburg's Fordsburg is said to be among the best places to find Pakistani food. The influx of people arriving from Pakistan has increased significantly in the last 10 years. Most of them are in grocery, electronics and cell phone businesses. They are also running a successful business of imported cars from Japan in Durban. In addition to business, many Pakistanis are working in the field of medicine throughout the country.

It has often been speculated that various Indian and Pakistani crime syndicates operate within the country, most of whom tend to be involved in drug smuggling. Similarly, the military wing of Muttahida Qaumi Movement had been using RSA for planning and preparation of their criminal activities.

In Feb 2010, a crowd of angry South African rioters, protesting unemployment issues burnt tyres and barricaded roads in a northern township in Johannesburg. Local media reported that Pakistani shopkeepers were among those whose premises were looted.

The Pakistan South Africa Association is a very effective organization that represents Pakistanis all over South Africa. It has 16 units that operate its offices from all provinces and has the central executive office in Pretoria. during covid lockdown they help the south African community a lot with daily food parcels, medicine e.t.c, city of Tshwane issued a letter of appreciation to acknowledge their efforts, Mr. Zahid Afzal is emerging a leader for Pakistani community who is currently serving the association as chairman social and welfare.

References

External links
 South African Pakistanis enormously contributing to country’s economy

South Africa
South Africa
Ethnic groups in South Africa